Solo in Mondsee is a live album by pianist Paul Bley recorded in 2001 and released on the ECM label in 2007.

Reception
The AllMusic review by Thom Jurek awarded the album 4½ stars stating "For anyone who has ever wondered about Bley and his amazing 60-year career in jazz, or for anyone interested in either the piano or improvisation, this recording, like its predecessor, will mystify, delight, and satisfy in ways that cannot really be imagined until Solo in Mondsee is actually encountered".

Track listing
All compositions by Paul Bley
 "Mondsee Variations I" - 6:39 
 "Mondsee Variations II" - 5:06 
 "Mondsee Variations III" - 2:06 
 "Mondsee Variations IV" - 8:44 
 "Mondsee Variations V" - 3:44 
 "Mondsee Variations VI" - 8:12 
 "Mondsee Variations VII" - 7:40 
 "Mondsee Variations VIII" - 4:38 
 "Mondsee Variations IX" - 3:12 
 "Mondsee Variations X" - 5:37
Recorded at Schloss Mondsee in Austria on June 25, 2001.

Personnel
 Paul Bley – piano

References

Albums produced by Manfred Eicher
ECM Records albums
Paul Bley live albums
Solo piano jazz albums
2007 albums